Yemen made its Paralympic Games début at the 1992 Summer Paralympics in Barcelona, with a three-man delegation. A.M. Al-Hamdany competed in the marathon (TW3-4 category), along with Said Al-Huribi, who also competed in swimming, in the 50m freestyle (S6). Shaif Al-Kawlany was scheduled to enter two events in table tennis, but was a non-starter in both. None of the three men won a medal.

Yemen have not return to the Paralympics after that.

Full results for Yemen at the Paralympics

See also
 Yemen at the Olympics

References and notes

 
Paralympics